The 1961 Los Angeles State Diablos football team represented Los Angeles State College—now known as California State University, Los Angeles—as a member of the California Collegiate Athletic Association (CCAA) during the 1961 NCAA College Division football season. Led by 11th-year head coach Leonard Adams, Los Angeles State compiled an overall record of 4–4–1 with a mark of 2–2–1 in conference play, tying for third place in the CCAA. The Diablos played three home games at L.A. State Stadium in Los Angeles and two at East Los Angeles College Stadium in Monterey Park, California.

Schedule

Team players in the NFL
The following Los Angeles State players were selected in the 1962 NFL Draft.

References

Los Angeles State
Cal State Los Angeles Diablos football seasons
Los Angeles State Diablos football